Musson is a surname. Notable people by that name include:

 Alfred Musson (1900–1995), English cricketer and British Army officer.
 Anthony Musson, professor of legal history at the University of Exeter.
 Bernard Musson (1925–2010), French actor.
 Chick Musson (1920–1955), English professional footballer.
 Dalan Musson, American screenwriter
 Ellen Musson (1867–1960), chair of the General Nursing Council for England and Wales.
 Francis Musson (1894–1962), English cricketer.
 Geoffrey Musson (1910–2008), British Army officer.
 Jacques Musson, retired French slalom canoeist.
 Jayson Musson, American artist.
 Jeremy Musson (born 1965), English author, editor and presenter, specialising in British country houses and architecture.
 Juanita Musson (1923–2011), American restaurateur.
 Karen Musson (born 1967), New Zealand former cricketer.
 Matthijs Musson (1598-1678), painter and art dealer.
 Peter Musson (born 1940), bassoonist.
 Ron Musson, hydroplane driver. 
 Rowland Musson (1912–1943), English cricketer and pilot. 
 Sharon Musson (born 1969), New Zealand swimmer.